Ernst Schwarz (6 August 1916, Vienna - 6 September 2003,  Münichreith) was an Austrian sinologist and translator.

Life 

Ernst Schwarz came from a Jewish merchant family from Vienna. His father, Desiderius Schwarz, and his mother, Bertha Schwarz had a shop in Mariahilfer Straße. He had a brother (Egon, 1904–1976), and two sisters (Lilly, 1908–1972 and Francis, 1909–2000). He studied Egyptology and medicine at the University of Vienna. After the annexation of Austria to the German Reich in March 1938, he was forced to leave the country. He traveled to Shanghai by sea with his brother Egon. There he learned Chinese through self-study, while he worked as a physical education teacher. Occasionally he stayed in Buddhist monasteries. In 1945, he worked in Nanjing as a translator; in 1946–47 he taught English literature at the university there. From 1947 to 1950, he was secretary at the Austrian embassy in Nanjing. Subsequently, he worked again as a translator, this time for the Foreign Languages Press in Beijing. From 1958 to 1960, he taught English at the University of Hangzhou, however, due to political problems during the time of the Great Leap Forward, he was forced to leave the People's Republic of China.

After staying in Great Britain and Belgium, he finally arrived in the GDR. Between 1961 and 1970, he taught Chinese language and literature as a research assistant and later as a lecturer at the East Asian Institute of the Humboldt University in East Berlin. In 1965, he received a doctorate in philosophy. After he retired from the University, he worked as a freelance translator and held occasional lectures at the Diplomatic Academy in Vienna. Chancellor Bruno Kreisky arranged him a teaching position at the Diplomatic Academy. He was personally acquainted with Trade Minister Fritz Bock, a childhood friend, Foreign Minister Rudolf Kirchschläger, Science Minister Hertha Firnberg, Health Minister Ingrid Leodolter, Friedrich Hoess diplomat, and Chief Magistrate Josef Bandion, among others.

In 1993, he returned from Berlin to Vienna. In 1994, it came to light that he worked for the State Security Service of the GDR (Stasi); he admitted his espionage activities without publicly repenting it. He retired to Münichreith in the Waldviertel, Lower Austria, where he spent his latter years.

Ernst Schwarz was best known for his translations of classical poems and philosophical texts from Chinese, which proved to be very popular with the reading public and they set high standards concerning Tao Yuan-Ming, Confucius and Lao Tse in the German-speaking world.

His autobiography, Tausend Tore hat die Wahrheit, (A Thousand Gates have the Truth),  published in Berlin  in 2001, is no longer in print.

In 1981, Ernst Schwarz received the F.-C.-Weiskopf Prize and in 1992 the Golden Medal of Honour of  Vienna
(Ehrenmedaille der Bundeshauptstadt Wien).
He is the father of actress Melan Schwarz aka Marijam Agischewa.

Selected works

 Die klassische chinesische Literatur und das Weltbild Chinas im Feudalzeitalter, Berlin 1964
 Zur Problematik der Qu Yuan-Forschung, Berlin 1965 (thesis)
 Der Glücksbegriff in China, Vienna 1976
 Stein des Anstoßes, Berlin 1978
 Damit verdien ich mir mein Paradies. Unbekannte Bildwerke in den Domen zu Magdeburg und Stendal (Gedichte), Berlin 1986
 Der alte Mönch. Gedichte zu chinesischen Tuschezeichnungen, Berlin 1990
 Die Weisheit des alten China, Munich 1994
 Das Leben des Bodhidharma, Düsseldorf [u.a.] 2000

Anthologies 
 Der Reiter im grünen Gewand (Chinas Völker erzählen; Folge 1), Beijing 1964; new edition in three volumes: Die schönsten Volkssagen aus China - Der Reiter im grünen Gewand , Die Legende vom Reis , Das langhaarige Mädchen  (Beijing, Verlag für fremdsprachige Literatur 2005).
 Chrysanthemen im Spiegel. Klassische chinesische Dichtungen, Berlin 1969
 Lob des Steinquells. Koreanische Lyrik, Weimar 1973
 Der Ruf der Phönixflöte, Berlin 1973
 Von den müßigen Gefühlen. Chinesische Liebesgedichte aus 3 Jahrtausenden, Leipzig [u.a.] 1978
 Shih-fu Wang: Das Westzimmer, Leipzig 1978
 Chinesische Liebesgedichte, Frankfurt (Main) 1980
 So sprach der Weise. Chinesisches Gedankengut aus 3 Jahrtausenden, Berlin 1981
 Li Tsching-dschau & Dschu Schu-dschen: Chinesische Frauenlyrik. Tzi-Lyrik der Sung-Zeit, Munich 1985
 Vom Weg allen Geistes. Sentenzen aus dem alten China, Berlin 1985
 Das gesprengte Grab, Berlin 1989
 So sprach der Meister, Munich, 1994
 Agischewa, A. & Schwarz, E.: Die heilige Büffelfrau. Indianische Schöpfungsmythen, Munich 1995
 Ein Spiegel ist des Weisen Herz. Sinnsprüche aus dem alten China, Munich 1996
 Schwarz, E. & Agischewa, A.: Der Trank der Unsterblichkeit. Chinesische Schöpfungsmythen und Volksmärchen, Munich 1997
 Die Glocke schallt, die Glocke schweigt. Zen-Buddhistische Weisheit, Zürich [u.a.] 1999
 Der rechte Weg. Chinesische Weisheiten, Berlin 2000

Translations
 Djiän Be-dsan (Jiǎn Bózàn 翦伯赞), Schao Hsün-dscheng (Shào Xúnzhèng 邵循正), Hu Hua (Hú Huá 胡华): Kurzer Abriß der chinesischen Geschichte, Beijing 1958.
 Tschin Dshao-jang (Qin Zhaoyang): Dorfskizzen, Beijing 1956
 Yubao Gao: Meine Kindheit, Beijing 1962
 Konfuzius: Gespräche des Meisters Kung, Munich 1985
 Li Tai Bo: Li Tai-bo, Berlin 1979
 Laudse (Laozi): Daudedsching (Tao Te King), Leipzig 1970 and Munich 1995
 Li Nan-li: Lo Tsai, der Tigerjäger und andere Geschichten, Beijing 1958
 Tao Yüan-ming: Pfirsichblütenquell, Leipzig 1967
 Gung Schu T.: Schu Ting, Berlin 1988
 Yuanwu: Bi-yän-lu. Aufzeichnungen des Meisters vom Blauen Fels, Munich 1999

Further reading 
 Günther Albrecht, Kurt Böttcher, Herbert Greiner-Mai and Paul-Günter Krohn: Schriftsteller der DDR. 2., unchanged edition. Bibliographisches Institut, Leipzig 1975.
 Konrad Herrmann: Begegnungen mit Ernst Schwarz. Books on Demand, Norderstedt 2012.
 Eva Jancak: Dreizehn Kapitel. Selbstverlag, Vienna 2014.

References 

Austrian sinologists
Austrian Jews
1916 births
2003 deaths
East German spies
Austrian translators
Chinese–German translators
Academic staff of the Humboldt University of Berlin
20th-century translators
People of the Stasi